Diring may refer to:
Diring, Khoptoginsky Nasleg, Churapchinsky District, Sakha Republic, a village (selo) in Khoptoginsky Nasleg of Churapchinsky District of the Sakha Republic, Russia
Diring, Tyolyoysky Nasleg, Churapchinsky District, Sakha Republic, a village (selo) in Tyolyoysky Nasleg of Churapchinsky District of the Sakha Republic, Russia